Thomas Throckmorton (1533 – March 1618 ) was an English politician, a Member (MP) of the Parliament of England for Warwickshire in 1558 and Warwick in 1559. He spent much of his life undergoing fines and long periods of imprisonment for recusancy. He resided primarily at Weston Underwood, Buckinghamshire.

Family 
Throckmorton was the son of Sir Robert Throckmorton (c. 1513 – 1581) and Muriel Berkeley (fl. 1516 – c. 1541). Thomas married, c. 1556, Margaret (or Mary) Whorwood (1533 – 28 April 1607), by whom he had one son, John, and four daughters, Elizabeth, Margaret, Eleanor, and Meriel. John Throckmorton was father of, among others, Robert Throckmorton, 1st Baronet (1599–1650), who was Thomas' heir at his death.

Gunpowder Plot
According to a Warwickshire website, Thomas Throckmorton went abroad before the Gunpowder Plot (1605), but he let Coughton Court to one of the conspirators, Sir Everard Digby. Throckmorton was not implicated in the plot, but fines for recusancy, previously waived, were reimposed.

Disambiguation
Thomas Throckmorton is the name of various historical figures. One is Thomas Throckmorton, the eldest son of Anthony Throckmorton, a Mercer of St. Martin's Lane, Westminster and Chastleton, Oxfordshire; Thomas married Julian, the widow of Thomas Wye of Lypiatt and had no children.

References

16th-century births
1618 deaths
English MPs 1558
English MPs 1559